The Badayev warehouses were a complex of wooden warehouses, originally built in St. Petersburg in 1914 by Igor Rasteryaev, a merchant of the 1st Guild. The warehouses, which occupied a site of 27 hectares, were named after the Soviet political functionary Aleksei Badayev. From October 1917 they were used to store food reserves.

History
At the beginning of the siege of Leningrad the warehouses were bombed by German forces and burned, so that the city lost some of its food reserves. This event is mentioned in a song by Vladimir Vysotsky, "I grew up during the siege of Leningrad ...". In Luftwaffe raids on 8 and 10 September 1941, about 40 sheds at the Badayev warehouses were burned; 3000 tons of flour and 2500 tons of sugar were stored there, representing the city's reserves for 1–3 days, according to the current norms. Up to 1 ton of burnt flour and 900 tons of burnt sugar were partially processed by the city's food enterprises.

For Leningrad's inhabitants the fire at the Badayev warehouses became a symbol of the famine of 1941-42. The idea that this fire was the main cause of the starvation in autumn and winter 1941-42 is wrong.  

After 1945 and until 1970 the rebuilt Badayev warehouses provided sheds for rent.

On 20 May 2010 the warehouses burned again, possibly due to a campfire. In December 2010 the RESO-Garantia insurance company paid ₽30.8M for goods destroyed in the fire and belonging to one of the companies using the Badayev warehouses.

The reconstruction of the warehouses is planned for the 2010s. A new convention center and hotel complex of 3000 rooms will be built, consisting of three buildings. One of the hotels will be built as a dominant feature - its height is planned to be up to 140 meters. An area of 28 hectares will be renovated by the TriGranit realty company.

References

Buildings and structures in Saint Petersburg
Warehouses
Commercial buildings completed in 1914